The Crimson Alberta Ferretti dress of Uma Thurman refers to the crimson Alberta Ferretti dress worn by Uma Thurman at the 72nd Academy Awards on March 26, 2000. In a poll by Debenhams published in The Daily Telegraph the dress was voted the 20th greatest red carpet gown of all time.

The dress remains among the most iconic dresses worn at the Academy Awards.

See also
 List of individual dresses
 Lavender Prada dress of Uma Thurman

References

2000s fashion
2000 clothing
Outfits worn at the Academy Awards ceremonies
Red dresses